X2 (formerly known as X) is a steel roller coaster operating at Six Flags Magic Mountain in Valencia, California. It is the world's first 4th Dimension roller coaster and was the final roller coaster conceived and installed by ride manufacturer Arrow Dynamics. The ride is unique in that the trains' seats pitch 360 degrees forwards and in reverse independent of the main chassis. The coaster initially opened to the public on January 12, 2002; numerous malfunctions delayed it from debuting in 2001 as was originally anticipated. On December 2, 2007, the ride closed for its transformation into X2. It was completely repainted, received new third-generation trains, and featured new special effects including a sound system and a pair of flame throwers. The ride reopened on May 24, 2008, following the upgrades.

History

On December 19, 2000, Six Flags Magic Mountain announced that it would be adding three roller coasters for the 2001 season as part of a $30 million expansion: Déjà Vu, Goliath Jr. and the original X. This would bring the total to 15, beating the world coaster capital, Cedar Point. X was a prototype 4th Dimension roller coaster by Arrow Dynamics.

The ride was planned to open in the summer of 2001, but the opening was delayed when it suffered design flaws. X opened for passholders on December 24, 2001, and officially opened on January 12, 2002. A month before opening, Arrow Dynamics filed for Chapter 11 bankruptcy due to the ride's misjudged costs stemming from Six Flags asking for a much larger ride than Arrow had successfully prototyped (This is covered in the 2016 documentary The Legacy of Arrow Development). The manufacturer had lost millions of dollars on the project.

X was closed indefinitely in June 2002 due to issues with the trains. It was discovered that one of the coach seats that flipped riders was not moving smoothly. The ride reopened on August 13, 2002 after modifications were made to make it reliable.

On February 8, 2003, Super Bowl MVP Dexter Jackson took a ride on X as part of a victory celebration of the Tampa Bay Buccaneers football team.

On November 1, 2007, Six Flags Magic Mountain announced a redesign. X closed on December 2, 2007, to be redesigned including new trains with a pneumatic restraint system (an improvement over the original mechanically operated restraints that would frequently jam), a new color scheme of red track and black supports (originally pink track and yellow supports), and an all-new, innovative state-of-the-art visual, audio and sensory effects. In a projected $10 million investment, X reopened on May 24, 2008, as X2. Six Flags Magic Mountain hired S&S Arrow to build new trains for X2. The new trains are lighter to reduce the amount of wear and downtime. X2 also took on a new load/unload method and third train to increase the ride capacity by 50%. Testing of the trains began on March 6, 2008.

The attraction was closed in 2013 due to a broken chain lift. It reopened in January 2014 with only a single train.

Ride experience
Each car on the train spins on its own independent axis 360 degrees forward or backward, which is being controlled by the outer rails of the track. Unlike traditional roller coasters, 4th Dimension roller coasters like X2 have four rails.

Layout
After departing from the loading station, the ride makes a 180-degree turn traveling over the queue and onto the lift hill. During this lift, riders are facing backwards.

During the initial drop, the seat assembly is rotated so that riders are positioned facing the ground. The train then enters an inside raven turn, where the cars are rotated again halfway through the loop to create a "lie-to-fly" maneuver; riders transition from lying on their backs facing backward to a  prone position, facing forward. After exiting the raven turn, the trains traverse a hill, during which the seat assemblies rotate backward 360 degrees, simulating a backflip. This is followed by a sweeping fan turn and a half twist "fly-to-lie" maneuver, in which riders flip forward 180 degrees to return to the original position of laying on their backs. Flame throwing special effects can be seen overhead as the train enters an outside raven turn immediately followed by another half twist. The track levels out and the train enters the final brake run before returning to the station.

Trains
X2 is a unique prototype design in which the seats can rotate forward or backward 360 degrees in a controlled spin. This is achieved by having four rails on the track. The two rails that control the spin of the seats move up and down relative to the main track and spin the seats using a rack and pinion gear mechanism.  These "rotation" rails don't support the train. The other two rails are for the weight-bearing wheels, capable of supporting these heavy trains.

Weighing , each vehicle has a wing-shaped design that spans . Riders sit on the outside of the coaster track in pairs. This gear rotates the seats forwards and backward throughout the ride. 

The ride also has an on-board audio soundtrack that features five songs heard throughout the ride:

 Harry Connick, Jr. - "It Had To Be You" (heard as the train exits the station)
 Portions of R. Lee Ermey's speech from Full Metal Jacket along with various movie quotes. (heard on the lift hill) 
 Metallica - "Enter Sandman" (heard on the lift hill) 
 Aerosmith - "Love in an Elevator" (heard right as the train crests the first drop)
 Beastie Boys - "Sabotage" (heard throughout the ride)
 Rage Against the Machine - "Wake Up" (heard after the train hits the final brake run)

Similar roller coasters

S&S Arrow opened the second roller coaster of this type, Eejanaika at Fuji-Q Highland in Fujiyoshida, Yamanashi, Japan. Eejanaika has several meanings, but "Ain't it great" is believed to be the relevant meaning in this situation. The turn back towards the lift hill on Eejanaika is a true overbanked turn, while on X2 this turn was not. Dinoconda, a third 4th Dimension coaster, opened at Dinosaur Valley in Shanghai, China in May 2012.

Awards

References

External links

Official X2 page

Roller coasters operated by Six Flags
Roller coasters introduced in 2002
Six Flags Magic Mountain
Roller coasters in California
2002 establishments in California

es:Montaña rusa 4ª dimensión